The 1997 Southland Conference men's basketball tournament was held March 6–8 at Hirsch Memorial Coliseum in Shreveport, Louisiana.

Southwest Texas State defeated  in the championship game, 74–64, to win their second Southland men's basketball tournament.

The Bobcats received a bid to the 1997 NCAA Tournament as the No. 16 seed in the Midwest region.

Format
Six of the ten conference members participated in the tournament field. They were seeded based on regular season conference records, with the top two seeds receiving a bye to the semifinal round. Tournament play began with the quarterfinal round.

Bracket

References

Southland Conference men's basketball tournament
Tournament
Southland Conference men's basketball tournament
Southland Conference men's basketball tournament
Basketball competitions in Louisiana
Sports in Shreveport, Louisiana
College sports tournaments in Louisiana